Gerald B. Green (April 16, 1939 – April 18, 2018) was an American Democratic politician, who served in the New Jersey General Assembly from 1992 until his death, representing the 22nd Legislative District (from 2002 to 2018) and the 17th Legislative District (1992 to 2002).

Early life
Gerald Green was born on April 16, 1939 in Roselle, and graduated from a public high school, where he was a "star basketball player". Along with his wife Wanda, Green lived in Plainfield.

Career
Green started his career as a businessman working in marketing and real estate. In 1982, he began his first term on the Union County's Board of Chosen Freeholders. During his second term from 1989–91, he was elected the board's chair in 1990. Green played a prominent role in the county's politics serving on its Planning Board, the Parks & Recreation Committee and Adolescent Substance Abuse Program. He also served as the president of Roselle and Linden Merchants Association and was an honorary chairman for the March of Dimes's chapter in New Jersey for 1990.

Green was elected to the New Jersey General Assembly as a Democrat in 1992 from the 17th Legislative District. Following redistricting in 2002, he represented the 22nd Legislative District in the Assembly till his death in 2018. During his 26-year tenure as an assemblyman, Green served on the Housing and Local Government (as Chair) and on the Health and Senior Services Committee. He was also a member of the Joint Committee on Housing Affordability, deputy speaker Pro Tempore from 2004–2007 and Deputy Speaker from 2002–2003. In 2008 he became the Assembly's Speaker Pro Tempore.

Green was the chairman of the Union County Democratic Committee from 2013 having replaced Charlotte DeFilippo. He was re-elected in 2015 but resigned in January 2018 citing health issues. Assemblyman Nicholas Scutari succeeded him in this capacity.

Before he died, Green was the longest-serving assemblymember in New Jersey. He was one of the key sponsors of the bill that required institutions of higher education to install sprinklers in all dormitories and was one of the facilitators responsible for bringing the Union County College campus to Plainfield.

Death
He died on April 18, 2018, just two days following his 79th birthday. Democratic and Republican officials offered their consolations on his death. Linda Carter was appointed in May 2018 to fill Green's vacant Assembly seat.

References

External links
Assemblyman Green's legislative web page, New Jersey Legislature
New Jersey Legislature financial disclosure forms
2016 2015 2014 2013 2012 2011 2010 2009 2008 2007 2006 2005 2004
Assembly Member Gerald C. 'Jerry' Green, Project Vote Smart
New Jersey Voter Information Website 2003

1939 births
2018 deaths
African-American state legislators in New Jersey
County commissioners in New Jersey
Democratic Party members of the New Jersey General Assembly
People from Roselle, New Jersey
Politicians from Plainfield, New Jersey
21st-century American politicians
21st-century African-American politicians
20th-century African-American people